Bassenheim is a municipality in the district Mayen-Koblenz, in Rhineland-Palatinate, Germany. It is part of the Verbandsgemeinde ("collective municipality") Weißenthurm. The municipal council consists of 20 people, 13 of them from the CDU and 7 from the SPD.

International relations

Bassenheim is twinned with:
  Pasym, Poland (originally a German town with a near-identical name, Passenheim)

References

Mayen-Koblenz
Districts of the Rhine Province